was a journalist, entrepreneur, politician and cabinet minister in the pre-war Empire of Japan.

Biography
Minoura was from Usuki, Bungo Province (present-day Oita Prefecture. He attended the Keio Gijuku, (the predecessor to Keio University, where he was a disciple of Fukuzawa Yukichi. After graduation, he joined the Yubin Hochi Shimbun in 1875 as a reporter, and rose rapidly ranks to become president of the company in 1890. He was once jailed for an editorial supporting greater public rights.

Joining the Rikken Kaishintō political party, he was elected to the House of Representatives of Japan in the 1890 General Election. While a member of the Diet of Japan, he was a driving force in attempts to reform the Press Law, and to remove censorship regulations and press bans, especially concerning political debates and issues. His proposals were continually defeated, until a compromise bill was passed in 1897 allowing for reduced fines and punishments. Minoura was vice-speaker of the House of Representatives from March 1904 to December 1908.

Minoura served in the 2nd Ōkuma Shigenobu administration as Minister of Communications in 1915–1916. However, his political career ended in a sensational political corruption case in 1926, when he was arrested along with a number of high-ranking members of government for accepted bribes from real estate companies in Osaka over the relocation of the Matsushima Brothels and incarcerated at Osaka Prison. Minoura had to this point been respected by the Japanese public for having no rumor of scandal attached to his name. After a highly publicized court trial, Minoura was found not guilty on 13 October 1927 and released.

References

Further reading

External links

1853 births
1927 deaths
People from Ōita Prefecture
Government ministers of Japan
Rikken Kaishintō politicians
19th-century Japanese politicians
Members of the House of Representatives (Empire of Japan)
Japanese journalists